Justin Woolverton is an American entrepreneur and CEO of the ice cream company Halo Top Creamery. He founded the company in 2011, while working as a corporate lawyer.

Career
Woolverton became a lawyer after studying at the University of California Los Angeles and then at Columbia Law School. Woolverton began his law career working as a corporate lawyer in Los Angeles, California. In his free time he took improv classes, read screenwriting books, and did standup at open mics in coffee shops, telling bad jokes.

The idea for Woolverton's low-calorie alternative to ice cream came about because of restrictions he made to his diet to manage his blood sugar levels. Instead of sugary treats, he'd have a bowl of Greek yogurt with fruit and stevia.

Eventually, he began to consider selling and scaling his ice cream. After a year of trying to make the taste and the consistency of the ice cream, Woolverton began selling Halo Top to stores.

In 2012 he launched his product. Woolverton and his business partner, Doug Bouton, funded the venture from personal savings and with the help of friends & family. Woolverton used social media marketing as one of the main marketing strategies, sending vouchers to influencers in the health and fitness industry. The research group, Mintel, stated that this strategy has been a key component behind its success.

Whole Foods became the first major company to agree to carry Halo Top, mainly in the Bay area. This connection allowed Halo Top Creamery to expand to other regions in the United States through partnerships with other Whole Foods regions. While the expansion of the brand was good news, the move was costing the business financially - namely, the slotting fee that most retailers charged. Having only raised $500,000 up to this point with no outside investment, the company was only running on a month to month basis. The situation was dire enough that Woolverton applied for a predatory loan during this period but was rejected.

In 2014 Sprouts removed Halo Top Creamery from 200 of their stores, and production failures added to the financial problems. Woolverton and Bouton secured $1 million in funding from angel investors and CircleUp in 2015.

In 2015 this success and promotion led to Halo Top having to rebrand. In 2016 a GQ reporter ate nothing but Halo Top Creamery for ten days. The article went viral and gave the brand much-needed exposure away from just health and fitness.

By 2017 Halo Top had grown to annual sales of $342.2 million.

Personal life
Woolverton currently resides in Los Angeles, California.

References

Businesspeople from Los Angeles
University of California, Los Angeles alumni
Columbia Law School alumni
Lawyers from Los Angeles
Living people
Year of birth missing (living people)